The Narcea is a river of Asturias.  It is a tributary of the Nalón River.

See also 
 List of rivers of Spain

Rivers of Spain
Rivers of Asturias